British Blind Sport (BBS) is a British charity that makes sport and recreational activities accessible to people who are visually impaired. The charity enables blind and partially sighted people to experience the same sporting opportunities as sighted people. Since its establishment in 1976, BBS has become a voice for visually impaired people in the world of sport and leisure, both in the United Kingdom and on an international level. It also leads in the UK with sight classification for elite and paralympic athletes.  Its headquarters are in Leamington Spa, Warwickshire.

The charity was founded in 1976 as the British Association for Sporting and Recreational Activities for the Blind (BASRAB) and changed its name to British Blind Sport in 1989.

In March 2013, Tony Larkin, sports coach at the Royal National College for the Blind, who led the British blind football team at the 2012 Summer Paralympics was appointed Patron of British Blind Sport.
Noel Thatcher, Paralympian medal winner is also a Patron.

Sports 

The sports managed by BBS include:
 Archery
 Athletics
 Cricket
 Football
 Golf
 Goalball
 Judo
 Shooting
 Target Shooting
 Ten Pin Bowling
 Tennis
 Swimming

References

External links
British Blind Sport

Charities for disabled people based in the United Kingdom
Disability rights organizations
Blindness organisations in the United Kingdom
Charities based in Warwickshire
1976 establishments in the United Kingdom
Blind sports
Parasports in the United Kingdom
Sports organizations established in 1976